Leonardo Chacón Corrales (born 29 June 1984) is a Costa Rican triathlete.

At the 2012 Summer Olympics men's triathlon on Tuesday, August 7, he placed 48th.

References

External links
 
 
 

1984 births
Living people
Costa Rican male triathletes
Triathletes at the 2012 Summer Olympics
Triathletes at the 2007 Pan American Games
Triathletes at the 2011 Pan American Games
Triathletes at the 2015 Pan American Games
Triathletes at the 2016 Summer Olympics
Olympic triathletes of Costa Rica
Pan American Games competitors for Costa Rica
20th-century Costa Rican people
21st-century Costa Rican people